Iaconelli is a surname, most commonly found in Brazil, and also in Italy, France and the United States of America.

Notable people with this surname
Carlos Iaconelli (born 1987), Brazilian racing car driver
Michael Iaconelli (born 1972), American professional bass fisherman and TV personality

References